El Crucero is a village in the Tequixquiac municipality, Mexico State in Mexico. The town is bordered on the north La Heredad Ranch, south to the town of Santiago Tequixquiac, east town of Tlapanaloya and west by the Apaxco municipality.

References

Populated places in the State of Mexico
Tequixquiac
Populated places established in 1954